The men's triple jump at the 2022 World Athletics U20 Championships was held at the Estadio Olímpico Pascual Guerrero on 4 and 5 August.

21 athletes from 18 countries were entered to the competition, however after the withdrawal of Theophilus Mudzengerere from Zimbabwe 20 athletes from 17 countries competed.

Records
U20 standing records prior to the 2022 World Athletics U20 Championships were as follows:

Results

Qualification
The qualification rounds took place on 4 August, in two groups, Group A started at 11:02 and Group B at 12:16. Athletes attaining a mark of at least 15.80 metres ( Q ) or at least the 12 best performers ( q ) qualified for the final. 13th athlete, Royan Walters from Jamaica, advanced to the final by jury of appeal.

Final
The final was started at 18:01 on 5 August.

References

Triple jump
Triple jump at the World Athletics U20 Championships